was a short-lived province in Hokkaidō.  It corresponded to modern-day Kushiro Subprefecture and part of Abashiri Subprefecture.

History
After 1869, the northern Japanese island became known as Hokkaido; and regional administrative subdivisions were identified, including Kushiro Province.<ref>Satow, Ernest. (1882). "The Geography of Japan" in {{Google books|gGYYAAAAYAAJ|Transactions of the Asiatic Society of Japan, Vols. 1-2, p. 88.|page=33}}</ref>

At the same time, Kushiro Province continued to exist for some purposes. For example, Kushiro is explicitly recognized in treaties in 1894 (a) between Japan and the United States and (b) between Japan and the United Kingdom.

Timeline
1869—use of the name Hokkaido started
August 15, 1869 Kushiro Province established with 7 districts
1872 Census finds a population of 1,734
 July 1881 Abashiri District (網尻郡) incorporated for Abashiri District (網走郡), Kitami Province
 1882—prefectures established
 1886—Hokkaido Agency established
 1947—Hokkaido Prefecture established

Districts
Shiranuka (白糠郡)
Ashoro (足寄郡)
Kushiro (釧路郡)
Akan (阿寒郡)
Abashiri (網尻郡)
Kawakami (川上郡)
Akkeshi (厚岸郡)

Notes

References
 Nussbaum, Louis-Frédéric and Käthe Roth. (2005).  Japan encyclopedia. Cambridge: Harvard University Press. ;  OCLC 58053128
 Papinot, Edmond. (1910). Historical and Geographic Dictionary of Japan.'' Tokyo: Librarie Sansaisha. OCLC 77691250

States and territories established in 1869
1882 disestablishments in Japan
Former provinces of Japan
1869 establishments in Japan